Chandler Vaughn (born February 25, 2000) is an American soccer player who currently plays as a full back for LA Galaxy II in the USL Championship.

Career

Youth
Vaughn attended Forest Park High School, where he was named a United Soccer Coaches Youth All-American during both his junior and senior year. Vaughn also played with the D.C. United academy for four seasons.

College & Amateur
In 2018, Vaughn attended the University of Pittsburgh to play college soccer. He made 26 appearances for the Panthers in his two seasons there, tallying two assists to his name. He was part of first Pitt men's soccer team to win an ACC Tournament match in program history, earning ACC All-Freshman and All-ACC Academic Team honors in his freshman season.

Vaughn transferred to Saint Louis University in 2020, going on to make 33 appearances with the Billikens, scoring two goals, tallying four assists, and was named to the A-10 All-Championship team in his senior year.

In 2021, Vaughn also played in the USL League Two for Kaw Valley FC, making four appearances.

Professional
On January 11, 2022, Vaughn was drafted was selected 60th overall in the 2022 MLS SuperDraft by LA Galaxy. On March 3, 2022, Vaughn was signed by LA Galaxy II ahead of their 2022 season in the USL Championship. He made his professional debut on March 19, 2022, starting in a 1–2 loss against San Antonio FC.

References

External links
 
 

2000 births
Living people
American soccer players
Association football defenders
LA Galaxy draft picks
LA Galaxy II players
Pittsburgh Panthers men's soccer players
People from Woodbridge, Virginia
Saint Louis Billikens men's soccer players
Soccer players from Virginia
United States men's youth international soccer players
USL Championship players
USL League Two players